Flying High Together is an album by Smokey Robinson and the Miracles on Motown Records' Tamla label, released in 1972. It is noted as The Miracles' last studio album with original lead singer Smokey Robinson, who retired from the act to concentrate on his duties as Vice President of The Motown Record Corporation. The album charted at #46 on the Billboard Pop Album chart, and featured two singles: the appropriately named "We've Come Too Far to End It Now", which matched the parent album's chart position on the Billboard singles chart, charting at #46, and reached the Top 10 of the Billboard R&B singles chart, charting at #9, and "I Can't Stand to See You Cry", which charted at #45 Pop, and #21 R&B.

The album also featured a cover of The Stylistics' 1971 hit "Betcha By Golly Wow", the "Theme from Love Story", and covers of the Michael Jackson solo hit, "Got to Be There" (featuring outstanding guitar work by Miracle Marv Tarplin), and The Chi-Lites'#1 hit, "Oh Girl". The album also features songs composed by Ashford & Simpson, Stevie Wonder and Syretta Wright, Bobby Miller, who was responsible for The Dells' long string of hits, and Motown producer Johnny Bristol, but curiously neither Smokey nor any of the other Miracles contributed to the writing on this album and Smokey himself produced only two tracks, the aforementioned "Got to Be There" and "Love Story".

The release of this album coincided with the group's final nationwide tour, before replacing Smokey with Billy Griffin. As of 2018, Flying High Together has yet to be issued on CD, but several of its songs have shown up on various Miracles foreign and domestic CD compilations. The Miracles' next studio album was 1973's Billy Griffin-led Renaissance.

Track listing

Side one 
 "I Can't Stand to See You Cry" (Johnny Bristol, Wade Brown, Jr., David Jones, Jr.)
 "Theme from Love Story" (Francis Lai, Carl Sigman)
 "We've Come Too Far to End It Now" (Bristol, Brown, Jones)
 "Flying High Together" (Bristol, Brown, Jones)
 "With Your Love Came" (Bristol, Brown, Jones)
 "It Will Be Alright" (Stevie Wonder, Syreeta Wright)

Side two 
 "Oh Girl" (Eugene Record)
 "You Ain't Livin' till You're Lovin'" (Nickolas Ashford, Valerie Simpson)
 "We Had a Love So Strong" (Wonder, Wright)
 "Got to Be There" (Elliot Willensky)
 "Betcha by Golly, Wow" (Linda Creed, Thom Bell)

Personnel

The Miracles 
 Bill "Smokey" Robinson – lead vocals
 Claudette Rodgers Robinson – backing vocals (soprano)
 Robert "Bobby" Rodgers – backing vocals (tenor)
 Ronald "Ronnie" White – backing vocals (baritone)
 Warren "Pete" Moore – backing vocals (bass)
 Marvin "Marv" Tarplin – guitar

Additional 
 The Funk Brothers – other instrumentation
 H.B. Barnum – arranger
 David Van De Pitte – arranger
 Eddie Nucilli – arranger

References

External links 
 Smokey Robinson & The Miracles - Flying High Together (1972) album review by John Lowe, credits & releases at AllMusic
 Smokey Robinson & The Miracles - Flying High Together (1972) album releases & credits at Discogs
 Smokey Robinson & The Miracles - Flying High Together (1972) album to be listened as stream on Spotify

1972 albums
The Miracles albums
Albums produced by Smokey Robinson
Albums produced by Johnny Bristol
Tamla Records albums
Albums produced by Stevie Wonder
Albums produced by Ashford & Simpson